is a Japanese actor and former singer. He was a member of the boy band Run&Gun from 2001 to 2014.

Career 
In 2000, at the age of 14, Kamiyama was part of D.A.N.K. (Daisuke Asakura New Kids), a performance troupe produced by Daisuke Asakura. In 2001, he appeared on the audition program Study Park!!, where he was selected as one of the members for the boy band Run&Gun, later debuting on July 4, 2001 with the single "Lay-Up!" During his time with the group, in 2005, Kamiyama also released a solo song titled "Byū Byū Kuru Yasashisa wa" for Run&Gun's first extended play, Hateshinai Tabi no Naka de...

In 2007, Kamiyama was cast as Romeo in the stage play adaptation of Air Gear. In the second installment he took over the lead role of Minami Ikki after Kenta Kamakari fell ill. He broke his arm during the second-to-last showing of the musical; however, he continued performing. In addition to this, Kamiyama also published his first novel, Flying Melon, which was co-written with Kosuke Yonehara. In 2009, Kamiyama starred in the all-male stage adaptation of Fruits Basket as Kyo Soma. In 2014, Kamiyama left Run&Gun to focus on acting full-time.

Personal life

In October 2017, Kamiyama married model Kurara Chibana.

Discography

Filmography

Movie
Route 58 (2003)
jam filmsシリーズ　min.jam第４話 (2005)
Hashiriya Zero 2 (2009)

TV Drama
 クッキングパパ - Cooking papa (2008)

Theatre

References

External links 
 

Tokyo
Living people
Singers from Tokyo
21st-century Japanese singers
21st-century Japanese male singers